Lant is aged urine. The term comes from Old English , which referred to urine. Collected urine was put aside to ferment until used for its chemical content in many pre-industrial processes, such as cleaning and production.

History 

Because of its ammonium content, lant was most commonly used for floor cleaning and laundry. According to early housekeeping guides, bedpans would be collected by one of the younger male servants and put away to ferment to a mild caustic before use.

In larger cottage industries, lant was used in wool-processing and as a source of saltpeter for gunpowder. In times of urgent need and in districts where these were the chief industries, the whole town was expected to contribute to its supply.

See also 
 Ammonia
 Urine
 Home remedies
 Nitrogen
 Svenska Lantchips

References 

Ray, John (1691) North Country Words
 Addy, Sidney (1888) Glossary of Sheffield Words, p.164
 
 
 Kelly, John F. "The Urine Cure and Other Curious Medical Treatments" Hippocrates Magazine. (May/June 1988) By Hercules
 
 

Urine